The Spanish flower (or canto liso estriado, "fluted smooth edge") is a type of coin flan shape. It consists of a smooth edge separated into equal sections by seven indents. At least two coin issuers, the European Union and Fiji, have mentioned explicitly that the Spanish flower shape was chosen to help the visually-impaired. However, the Polish commemorative coin has different technical specifications than the circulation issue, which makes it impractical in daily use. Therefore, the Spanish flower shape has novelty value only on this coin.

Origin

The Spanish 50 peseta coins issued between 1990 and 2000 were the first to feature the Spanish flower shape.

Coins with Spanish flower shape

 Spain, 50 pesetas 1990-1999
 Eurozone, 20 euro cent from 1999
 Azerbaijan, 10 qəpik from 2006
 New Zealand, 20 cents from 2006
 Malaysia, 50 sen from 2012
 Poland, 2 złote 2012, 50th anniversary of Radio of Poland
 Fiji, 2 dollars
 Sri Lanka, 2 Rupees, 2017
 Kazakhstan, 200 tenge, 2020

References

Coins
Assistive technology